J. D. Allen III (born December 11, 1972) is an American jazz tenor saxophonist and composer.

Career
After moving to New York City, Allen played with George Cables, Betty Carter, Ron Carter, Jack DeJohnette, Frank Foster, Butch Morris, David Murray, and Wallace Roney. Closer to his generation, he has played with Lucian Ban, Cindy Blackman, Gerald Cleaver, Dave Douglas, Orrin Evans, Duane Eubanks, Marcus Gilmore, Russell Gunn, Winard Harper, Elisabeth Kontomanou, Meshell Ndegeocello, Jeremy Pelt, Eric Revis.

Allen's first solo album, In Search Of (Criss Cross, 1999), led to his selection as Best New Artist in Italy. In 2002, his second album was chosen a top ten album of the year by Jazziz magazine. Ten years later he was named best composer and best tenor saxophonist in the Critics' Poll at DownBeat magazine. A critic at NPR picked his album Victory (Sunnyside, 2011) for the number three spot in the top twenty albums of 2011. Allen also works under the pseudonym "Bigger Thomas" and "Cross Damon."

Discography

As leader
 In Search of J.D. Allen (Red, 1999)
 Pharaoh's Children (Criss Cross Jazz, 2003)
 I Am I Am (Sunnyside, 2008)
 Shine! (Sunnyside, 2009)
 Victory! (Sunnyside, 2011)
 The Matador and the Bull (Savant, 2012)
 Grace (Savant, 2013)
 Bloom (Savant, 2014)
 Graffiti (Savant, 2015)
 Americana: Musings on Jazz and Blues (Savant, 2016)
 Radio Flyer (Savant, 2017)
 Love Stone (Savant, 2018)
 Barracoon (Savant, 2019)
 Toys / Die Dreaming (Savant, 2020)
 Queen City (Savant, 2021)
 Americana, Vol. 2 (Savant, 2022)

As co-leader
 Red Stars (2004) with Victor Lewis and Fabio Morgera

As sideman
With Cindy Blackman
 Works on Canvas (HighNote, 2000)
 Someday... (HighNote, 2001)
 Music for the New Millennium (HighNote, 2006)

With Orrin Evans
 The Band – Live at Widener University (2005)
 Easy Now (2005)
 Liberation Blues (2014)

With Winard Harper
 Trap Dancer (1998)
 Winard (1999)

With Lisa Hilton
 Twilight & Blues (2009)
 Underground (2011)
 American Impressions (2012)
 Kaleidoscope (2014)
 Horizons (2015)
 Nocturnal (2016)
 Escapism (2017)
 Chalkboard Destiny (2019)
 life is beautiful (2022)

With Fabio Morgera
 Slick (1998)
 Colors (2000)

With Jeremy Pelt
 November (MaxJazz, 2008)
 Men of Honor (HighNote, 2010)
 The Talented Mr. Pelt (HighNote, 2011)
 Soul (HighNote, 2012)

With Tarbaby
 Tarbaby (2009)
 The End of Fear (2010)

With others
 Duane Eubanks, Second Take (1998)
 Elisabeth Kontomanou, Embrace (1998)
 Russell Gunn, Blue on the D.L. (2002)
 Eric Revis, Tales of a Stuttering Mime (2004)
 Kerem Görsev, New York Days (2005)
 Lucian Ban, The Tuba Project (2005)
 Nigel Kennedy, Blue Note Sessions (2006)
 Gerald Cleaver, Detroit (2007)
 Ozan Musluoglu, 40th Day (2011)
 Jaimeo Brown, Transcendence (2013)
 DJ Clockwork,
 Bootsy Collins,
 Kris Davis, Diatom Ribons (2019)
 Erick Wyatt, The Golden Rule: For Sonny (2019)
 Gregg August, Dialogues On Race (2020)
 Quincy Davis, Q Vision (2020)

References

External links
Official site
JD Allen Trio at NewportJazz Festival

Jazz tenor saxophonists
American jazz tenor saxophonists
American male saxophonists
1972 births
Living people
21st-century American saxophonists
21st-century American male musicians
American male jazz musicians
Sunnyside Records artists
Criss Cross Jazz artists
Red Records artists
HighNote Records artists